Below is the list of populated places in Balıkesir Province, Turkey by the ilçes (districts). In the following lists first place in each list is the administrative center of the district.

Altıeylül
 Altıeylül
 Akarsu, Altıeylül
 Akçakaya, Altıeylül
 Akçaköy, Altıeylül
 Aliağa, Altıeylül
 Aslıhan, Altıeylül
 Aslıhan Tepecik, Altıeylül
 Ataköy, Altıeylül
 Atköy, Altıeylül
 Aynaoğlu, Altıeylül
 Ayşebacı, Altıeylül
 Ayvacık, Altıeylül
 Ayvatlar, Altıeylül
 Bağalan, Altıeylül
 Bahçedere, Altıeylül
 Balıklı, Altıeylül
 Bayat, Altıeylül
 Bereketli, Altıeylül
 Beşpınar, Altıeylül
 Bigatepe, Altıeylül
 Bozen, Altıeylül
 Büyük Bostancı, Altıeylül
 Cinge, Altıeylül
 Çakıllık, Altıeylül
 Çamköy, Altıeylül
 Çandır, Altıeylül
 Çayırhisar, Altıeylül
 Çınarlıdere, Altıeylül
 Çiçekpınar, Altıeylül
 Çiftçidere, Altıeylül
 Çiftlik, Altıeylül
 Çukur Hüseyin, Altıeylül
 Dallımandıra, Altıeylül
 Dedeburnu, Altıeylül
 Dereçiftlik, Altıeylül
 Dereköy, Altıeylül
 Dişbudak, Altıeylül
 Ertuğrul, Altıeylül
 Gökçeören, Altıeylül
 Gökköy, Altıeylül
 Halalca, Altıeylül
 İnkaya, Altıeylül
 Kabaklı, Altıeylül
 Karabeyler, Altıeylül
 Karakavak, Altıeylül
 Karakaya, Altıeylül
 Karamanköy, Altıeylül
 Karamanlar, Altıeylül
 Kılcılar, Altıeylül
 Kirazköy, Altıeylül
 Kirazpınar, Altıeylül
 Konakpınar, Altıeylül
 Kozderegüvem, Altıeylül
 Kozören, Altıeylül
 Köseler, Altıeylül
 Köylüköy, Altıeylül
 Kuşkaya, Altıeylül
 Kutludüğün, Altıeylül
 Kuyualan, Altıeylül
 Küçük Bostancı, Altıeylül
 Küpeler, Altıeylül
 Kürse, Altıeylül
 Macarlar, Altıeylül
 Meryemdere, Altıeylül
 Orhanlı, Altıeylül
 Ortamandıra, Altıeylül
 Ovabayındır, Altıeylül
 Ovaköy, Altıeylül
 Pamukçu, Altıeylül
 Paşaköy, Altıeylül
 Sarıalan, Altıeylül
 Selimiye, Altıeylül
 Sıvatpınar, Altıeylül
 Taşköy, Altıeylül
 Taşpınar, Altıeylül
 Tayyipler, Altıeylül
 Turnalar, Altıeylül
 Türkali, Altıeylül
 Yakupköy, Altıeylül
 Yenice, Altıeylül
 Yeşiller, Altıeylül
 Yeşilyurt, Altıeylül

Karesi
 Karesi
 Aktarma, Karesi
 Alacabayır, Karesi
 Armutalan, Karesi
 Bakacak, Karesi
 Beyköy, Karesi
 Boğazköy, Karesi
 Büyükpınar, Karesi
 Çanacık, Karesi
 Çaypınar, Karesi
 Davutlar, Karesi
 Deliktaş, Karesi
 Düzoba, Karesi
 Fethiye, Karesi
 Halkapınar, Karesi
 Hisaralan, Karesi
 İbirler, Karesi
 Kabakdere, Karesi
 Kalaycılar, Karesi
 Karacaören, Karesi
 Karakol, Karesi
 Kavaklı, Karesi
 Kırmızılar, Karesi
 Kocaavşar, Karesi
 Köteyli, Karesi
 Kurtdere, Karesi
 Naipli, Karesi
 Ortaca, Karesi
 Ovacık, Karesi
 Şamlı, Karesi
 Taşkesiği, Karesi
 Tatlıpınar, Karesi
 Toybelen, Karesi
 Turplu, Karesi
 Üçpınar, Karesi
 Yağcılar, Karesi
 Yaylabayır, Karesi
 Yaylacık, Karesi
 Yeni İskender, Karesi
 Yeniköy, Karesi
 Yeroluk, Karesi
 Yeşilova, Karesi
 Ziyaretli, Karesi

Ayvalık
 Ayvalık
 Akçapınar, Ayvalık		
 Altınova, Ayvalık		
 Bağyüzü, Ayvalık		
 Beşiktepe, Ayvalık		
 Bulutçeşme, Ayvalık		
 Çakmak, Ayvalık		
 Çamoba, Ayvalık		
 Hacıveliler, Ayvalık		
 Karaayıt, Ayvalık		
 Kırcalar, Ayvalık		
 Küçükköy, Ayvalık		
 Murateli, Ayvalık		
 Mutlu, Ayvalık		
 Odaburnu, Ayvalık		
 Tıfıllar, Ayvalık		
 Türközü, Ayvalık		
 Üçkabaağaç, Ayvalık		
 Yeniköy, Ayvalık

Balya
Balya
 Akbaş, Balya 		
 Alidemirci, Balya 		
 Bengiler, Balya 		
 Çakallar, Balya 		
 Çalova, Balya 		
 Çamavşar, Balya 		
 Çamucu, Balya 		
 Çiğdem, Balya 		
 Çukurcak, Balya 		
 Dereköy, Balya 		
 Doğanlar, Balya 		
 Dörtyol, Balya 		
 Farsak, Balya 		
 Göktepe, Balya 		
 Habipler, Balya 		
 Hacıhüseyin, Balya 		
 Havutbaşı, Balya 		
 Kadıköy, Balya 		
 Kaşıkçı, Balya 		
 Kavakalanı, Balya 		
 Kocabük, Balya 		
 Medrese, Balya 		
 Müstecap, Balya 		
 Narlı, Balya 		
 Patlak, Balya 		
 Semizköy, Balya 		
 Yaylacık, Balya 		
 Yazlık, Balya 		
 Danişment, Balya 		
 Değirmendere, Balya 		
 Göloba, Balya 		
 Kayapınar, Balya 		
 Koyuneri, Balya 		
 Mancılık, Balya 		
 Orhanlar, Balya 		
 Örenköy, Balya 		
 Gökmusa, Balya 		
 Ilıca, Balya 		
 Karacahisar, Balya 		
 Karlık, Balya 		
 Kayalar, Balya 		
 Söbücealan, Balya 		
 Yarışalanı, Balya 		
 Yenikavak, Balya

Bandırma
 Bandırma
Akçapınar, Bandırma		
Aksakal, Bandırma		
Bereketli, Bandırma		
Beyköy, Bandırma		
Bezirci, Bandırma		
Çakılköy, Bandırma		
Çarıkköy, Bandırma		
Çepni, Bandırma		
Çinge, Bandırma		
Dedeoba, Bandırma		
Doğa, Bandırma		
Doğanpınar, Bandırma		
Doğruca, Bandırma		
Dutliman, Bandırma		
Edincik, Bandırma		
Emre, Bandırma		
Ergili, Bandırma		
Erikli, Bandırma		
Eskiziraatli, Bandırma		
Gölyaka, Bandırma		
Hıdırköy, Bandırma		
Kirazlı, Bandırma		
Kuşcenneti, Bandırma		
Külefli, Bandırma		
Mahbubeler, Bandırma		
Misakça, Bandırma		
Orhaniye, Bandırma		
Ömerli, Bandırma		
Şirinçavuş, Bandırma		
Yenice, Bandırma		
Yenisığırcı, Bandırma		
Yeniyenice, Bandırma		
Yeniziraatli, Bandırma		
Yeşilçomlu, Bandırma

Bigadiç
Bigadiç
 Adalı, Bigadiç		
 Akyar, Bigadiç		
 Alanköy, Bigadiç		
 Altınlar, Bigadiç		
 Aşağıçamlı, Bigadiç		
 Aşağıgöcek, Bigadiç		
 Babaköy, Bigadiç		
 Bademli, Bigadiç		
 Balatlı, Bigadiç		
 Başçeşme, Bigadiç		
 Beğendikler, Bigadiç		
 Bekirler, Bigadiç		
 Bozbük, Bigadiç		
 Çağış, Bigadiç		
 Çaldere, Bigadiç		
 Çamköy, Bigadiç		
 Çayüstü, Bigadiç		
 Çekirdekli, Bigadiç		
 Çeribaşı, Bigadiç		
 Çıtak, Bigadiç		
 Çömlekçi, Bigadiç		
 Davutça, Bigadiç		
 Davutlar, Bigadiç		
 Dedeçınar, Bigadiç		
 Değirmenli, Bigadiç		
 Dikkonak, Bigadiç		
 Doğançam, Bigadiç		
 Durasılar, Bigadiç		
 Dündarcık, Bigadiç		
 Elyapan, Bigadiç		
 Emirler, Bigadiç		
 Esenli, Bigadiç		
 Güvemçetmi, Bigadiç		
 Hacıömerderesi, Bigadiç		
 Hamidiye, Bigadiç		
 Hisarköy, Bigadiç		
 Işıklar, Bigadiç		
 İğciler, Bigadiç		
 İlyaslar, Bigadiç		
 İskeleköy, Bigadiç		
 Kadıköy, Bigadiç		
 Kalafat, Bigadiç		
 Karabahçe, Bigadiç		
 Kargın, Bigadiç		
 Kayalıdere, Bigadiç		
 Kayırlar, Bigadiç		
 Kırca, Bigadiç		
 Kızılçukur, Bigadiç		
 Kozpınar, Bigadiç		
 Köseler, Bigadiç		
 Küçükyeniköy, Bigadiç		
 Kürsü, Bigadiç		
 Mecidiye, Bigadiç		
 Meyvalı, Bigadiç		
 Okçular, Bigadiç		
 Okçularyeri, Bigadiç		
 Osmanca, Bigadiç
 Özgören, Bigadiç		
 Panayır, Bigadiç		
 Salmanlı, Bigadiç		
 Topalak, Bigadiç		
 Tozağan, Bigadiç		
 Turfullar, Bigadiç		
 Yağcıbedir, Bigadiç		
 Yağcılar, Bigadiç		
 Yeniköy, Bigadiç		
 Yeşildere, Bigadiç		
 Yolbaşı, Bigadiç		
 Yukarıçamlı, Bigadiç		
 Yukarıgöçek, Bigadiç		
 Yürücekler, Bigadiç

Burhaniye
 Burhaniye
 Ağacık, Burhaniye		
 Avunduk, Burhaniye		
 Bahadınlı, Burhaniye		
 Börezli, Burhaniye		
 Çallı, Burhaniye		
 Çamtepe, Burhaniye		
 Çoruk, Burhaniye		
 Damlalı, Burhaniye		
 Dutluca, Burhaniye		
 Hacıbozlar, Burhaniye		
 Hisarköy, Burhaniye		
 Karadere, Burhaniye		
 Kırtık, Burhaniye		
 Kızıklı, Burhaniye		
 Kurucaoluk, Burhaniye		
 Kuyucak, Burhaniye		
 Kuyumcu, Burhaniye		
 Pelitköy, Burhaniye		
 Sübeylidere, Burhaniye		
 Şahinler, Burhaniye		
 Şarköy, Burhaniye		
 Tahtacı, Burhaniye		
 Taylıeli, Burhaniye		
 Yabancılar, Burhaniye		
 Yaylacık, Burhaniye		
 Yunuslar, Burhaniye

Dursunbey
Dursunbey
 Adaören, Dursunbey		
 Akbaşlar, Dursunbey		
 Akçagüney, Dursunbey		
 Akyayla, Dursunbey		
 Alaçam, Dursunbey		
 Alagüney, Dursunbey		
 Arıklar, Dursunbey		
 Aşağımusalar, Dursunbey		
 Aşağıyağcılar, Dursunbey		
 Ayvacık, Dursunbey		
 Aziziye, Dursunbey		
 Bayıryüzügüney, Dursunbey		
 Beyce, Dursunbey		
 Beyel, Dursunbey		
 Boyalıca, Dursunbey		
 Büyükakçaalan, Dursunbey		
 Çakırca, Dursunbey		
 Çaltıcak, Dursunbey		
 Çamharman, Dursunbey		
 Çamköy, Dursunbey		
 Çanakçı, Dursunbey		
 Çatalçam, Dursunbey		
 Çelikler, Dursunbey		
 Çınarköy, Dursunbey		
 Dada, Dursunbey		
 Değirmenciler, Dursunbey		
 Delice, Dursunbey		
 Demirciler, Dursunbey		
 Dereköy, Dursunbey		
 Doğancılar, Dursunbey		
 Durabeyler, Dursunbey		
 Ericek, Dursunbey		
 Gazellidere, Dursunbey		
 Göbül, Dursunbey		
 Gökçedağ, Dursunbey		
 Gökçepınar, Dursunbey		
 Gölcük, Dursunbey		
 Güğü, Dursunbey		
 Gürleyen, Dursunbey		
 Hacıahmetpınarı, Dursunbey		
 Hacılar, Dursunbey		
 Hacıömerler, Dursunbey		
 Hamzacık, Dursunbey		
 Hasanlar, Dursunbey		
 Hindikler, Dursunbey		
 Hondular, Dursunbey		
 Hopanlar, Dursunbey		
 Işıklar, Dursunbey		
 İrfaniye, Dursunbey		
 İsmailler, Dursunbey		
 Karagöz, Dursunbey		
 Karakaya, Dursunbey		
 Karamanlar, Dursunbey		
 Karapınar, Dursunbey		
 Kardeşler, Dursunbey		
 Karyağmaz, Dursunbey		
 Kavacık, Dursunbey		
 Kavakköy, Dursunbey		
 Kazimiye, Dursunbey		
 Kızılcadere, Dursunbey		
 Kızılöz, Dursunbey		
 Kireç, Dursunbey		
 Kumlu, Dursunbey		
 Kurtlar, Dursunbey		
 Kuzköy, Dursunbey		
 Küçükakçaalan, Dursunbey		
 Küçükler, Dursunbey		
 Mahmudiye, Dursunbey		
 Mahmutça, Dursunbey		
 Meydançayırı, Dursunbey		
 Mıcırlar, Dursunbey		
 Naipler, Dursunbey		
 Odaköy, Dursunbey		
 Osmaniye, Dursunbey		
 Örenköy, Dursunbey		
 Poyracık, Dursunbey		
 Ramazanlar, Dursunbey		
 Resüller, Dursunbey		
 Reşadiye, Dursunbey		
 Saçayak, Dursunbey		
 Sağırlar, Dursunbey		
 Sakızköy, Dursunbey		
 Sarısipahiler, Dursunbey		
 Sarnıçköy, Dursunbey		
 Sebiller, Dursunbey		
 Selimağa, Dursunbey		
 Sinderler, Dursunbey		
 Süleler, Dursunbey		
 Şabanlar, Dursunbey		
 Şenköy, Dursunbey		
 Tafak, Dursunbey		
 Taşkesiği, Dursunbey		
 Taşpınar, Dursunbey		
 Tepeköy, Dursunbey		
 Tezlik, Dursunbey		
 Turnacık, Dursunbey		
 Umurlar, Dursunbey		
 Veliler, Dursunbey		
 Yassıören, Dursunbey		
 Yukarımusalar, Dursunbey		
 Yukarıyağcılar, Dursunbey		
 Yunuslar, Dursunbey

Edremit
 Edremit
 Akçay, Edremit		
 Altınoluk, Edremit		
 Arıtaşı, Edremit		
 Avcılar, Edremit		
 Beyoba, Edremit		
 Bostancı, Edremit		
 Çamcı, Edremit		
 Çamlıbel, Edremit		
 Çıkrıkçı, Edremit		
 Dereli, Edremit		
 Doyran, Edremit		
 Güre, Edremit		
 Hacıarslanlar, Edremit		
 Kadıköy, Edremit		
 Kavlaklar, Edremit		
 Kızılkeçili, Edremit		
 Mehmetalan, Edremit		
 Narlı, Edremit		
 Ortaoba, Edremit		
 Pınarbaşı, Edremit		
 Tahtakuşlar, Edremit		
 Yaşyer, Edremit		
 Yaylaönü, Edremit		
 Yolören, Edremit		
 Zeytinli, Edremit

Erdek
Erdek
 Aşağıyapıcı, Erdek 		
 Balıklı, Erdek 		
 Ballıpınar, Erdek 		
 Belkıs, Erdek 		
 Çakıl, Erdek 		
 Çayağzı, Erdek 		
 Çeltikçi, Erdek 		
 Doğanlar, Erdek 		
 Hamamlı, Erdek 		
 Harmanlı, Erdek 		
 İlhan, Erdek 		
 Karşıyaka, Erdek 		
 Kestanelik, Erdek 		
 Narlı, Erdek 		
 Ocaklar, Erdek 		
 Ormanlı, Erdek 		
 Paşalimanı, Erdek 		
 Poyrazlı, Erdek 		
 Tatlısu, Erdek 		
 Turan, Erdek 		
 Tuzla, Erdek 		
 Yukarıyapıcı, Erdek

Gömeç
 Gömeç
 Dursunlu, Gömeç 		
 Hacıhüseyinler, Gömeç 		
 Hacıoğlu, Gömeç 		
 Hacıosman, Gömeç 		
 Karaağaç, Gömeç 		
 Keremköy, Gömeç 		
 Kobaşlar, Gömeç 		
 Kumgedik, Gömeç 		
 Kuyualan, Gömeç 		
 Ulubeyler, Gömeç

Gönen
Gönen
 Akçapınar, Gönen
 Alacaoluk, Gönen
 Alaettin, Gönen
 Alaşar, Gönen
 Armutlu, Gönen
 Asmalıdere, Gönen
 Atıcıoba, Gönen
 Ayvalıdere, Gönen
 Babayaka, Gönen
 Bakırlı, Gönen
 Balcı, Gönen
 Balcıdede, Gönen
 Bayramiç, Gönen
 Beyoluk, Gönen
 Bostancı, Gönen
 Buğdaylı, Gönen
 Büyüksoğuklar, Gönen
 Canbaz, Gönen
 Çakmak, Gönen
 Çalıca, Gönen
 Çalıoba, Gönen
 Çatak, Gönen
 Çığmış, Gönen
 Çınarlı, Gönen
 Çınarpınar, Gönen
 Çifteçeşmeler, Gönen
 Çiftlikalan, Gönen
 Çobanhamidiye, Gönen
 Dereköy, Gönen
 Dışbudak, Gönen
 Dumanalan, Gönen
 Ekşidere, Gönen
 Fındıklı, Gönen
 Gaybular, Gönen
 Gebeçınar, Gönen
 Gelgeç, Gönen
 Geyikli, Gönen
 Gökçesu, Gönen
 Gündoğan, Gönen
 Güneşli, Gönen
 Hacımenteş, Gönen
 Hacıvelioba, Gönen
 Hafızhüseyinbey, Gönen
 Hasanbey, Gönen
 Havutça, Gönen
 Hodul, Gönen
 Ilıcak, Gönen
 Ilıcaoba, Gönen
 İncirli, Gönen
 Kalburcu, Gönen
 Kalfaköy, Gönen
 Kaplanoba, Gönen
 Karaağaçalan, Gönen
 Karalarçiftliği, Gönen
 Karasukabaklar, Gönen
 Kavakalan, Gönen
 Kavakoba, Gönen
 Keçeler, Gönen
 Kınalar, Gönen
 Killik, Gönen
 Kocapınar, Gönen
 Koçbayır, Gönen
 Korudeğirmen, Gönen
 Körpeağaç, Gönen
 Köteyli, Gönen
 Kumköy, Gönen
 Küçüksoğuklar, Gönen
 Küpçıktı, Gönen
 Muratlar, Gönen
 Ortaoba, Gönen
 Osmanpazar, Gönen
 Ömerler, Gönen
 Paşaçiftlik, Gönen
 Pehlivanhoca, Gönen
 Saraçlar, Gönen
 Sarıköy, Gönen
 Sebepli, Gönen
 Söğüt, Gönen
 Suçıktı, Gönen
 Şaroluk, Gönen
 Tahtalı, Gönen
 Taştepe, Gönen
 Turplu, Gönen
 Tuzakçı, Gönen
 Tütüncü, Gönen
 Ulukır, Gönen
 Üçpınar, Gönen
 Üzümlü, Gönen
 Yeniakçapınar, Gönen
 Yürükkeçidere, Gönen

Havran
Havran
 Büyükdere, Havran
 Büyükşapçı, Havran
 Çakırdere, Havran
 Çakmak, Havran
 Çamdibi, Havran
 Dereören, Havran
 Eğmir, Havran
 Eseler, Havran
 Fazlıca, Havran
 Halılar, Havran
 Hallaçlar, Havran
 Hüseyinbeşeler, Havran
 İnönü, Havran
 Kalabak, Havran
 Karalar, Havran
 Karaoğlanlar, Havran
 Kobaklar, Havran
 Kocadağ, Havran
 Kocaseyit, Havran
 Köylüce, Havran
 Küçükdere, Havran
 Küçükşapçı, Havran
 Sarnıç, Havran
 Tarlabaşı, Havran
 Taşarası, Havran
 Temaşalık, Havran
 Tepeoba, Havran

İvrindi
İvrindi
 Akçal, İvrindi
 Aşağıkaleoba, İvrindi
 Ayaklı, İvrindi
 Bozören, İvrindi
 Büyükfındık, İvrindi
 Büyükılıca, İvrindi
 Büyükyenice, İvrindi
 Çarkacı, İvrindi
 Çatalan, İvrindi
 Çelimler, İvrindi
 Çiçekli, İvrindi
 Çobanlar, İvrindi
 Çukurlar, İvrindi
 Çukuroba, İvrindi
 Değirmenbaşı, İvrindi
 Demirciler, İvrindi
 Döşeme, İvrindi
 Erdel, İvrindi
 Eriklikömürcü, İvrindi
 Evciler, İvrindi
 Gebeçınar, İvrindi
 Geçmiş, İvrindi
 Gökçeler, İvrindi
 Gökçeyazı, İvrindi
 Gömeniç, İvrindi
 Gözlüçayır, İvrindi
 Gümeli, İvrindi
 Hacıahmetler, İvrindi
 Haydar, İvrindi
 Hüseyinbeyobası, İvrindi
 Ilıcakpınar, İvrindi
 İkizce, İvrindi
 Karaçepiş, İvrindi
 Kaşağıl, İvrindi
 Kayapa, İvrindi
 Kılcılar, İvrindi
 Kına, İvrindi
 Kınık, İvrindi
 Kıpıklar, İvrindi
 Kiraz Ören, İvrindi
 Kışladere, İvrindi
 Kocaeli, İvrindi
 Kocaoba, İvrindi
 Korucu, İvrindi
 Kuşdere, İvrindi
 Küçükfındık, İvrindi
 Küçükılıca, İvrindi
 Küçükyenice, İvrindi
 Mallıca, İvrindi
 Osmanköy, İvrindi
 Osmanlar, İvrindi
 Pelitören, İvrindi
 Sarıca, İvrindi
 Sarıpınar, İvrindi
 Sofular, İvrindi
 Soğanbükü, İvrindi
 Susuzyayla, İvrindi
 Taşdibi, İvrindi
 Topuzlar, İvrindi
 Yağlılar, İvrindi
 Yaren, İvrindi
 Yeşilköy, İvrindi
 Yürekli, İvrindi

Kepsut
 Kepsut
 Ahmetölen, Kepsut
 Akçakertil, Kepsut
 Akçaköy, Kepsut
 Alagüney, Kepsut
 Armutlu, Kepsut
 Bağtepe, Kepsut
 Bektaşlar, Kepsut
 Beyköy, Kepsut
 Bükdere, Kepsut
 Büyükkatrancı, Kepsut
 Çalkandil, Kepsut
 Dalköy, Kepsut
 Danahisar, Kepsut
 Darıçukuru, Kepsut
 Dedekaşı, Kepsut
 Dereli, Kepsut
 Dombaydere, Kepsut
 Durak, Kepsut
 Eşeler, Kepsut
 Eyüpbükü, Kepsut
 Göbel, Kepsut
 Gökköy, Kepsut
 Hotaşlar, Kepsut
 Işıklar, Kepsut
 İsaalan, Kepsut
 Kalburcu, Kepsut
 Karacaağaç, Kepsut
 Karacaören, Kepsut
 Karaçaltı, Kepsut
 Karagöz, Kepsut
 Karahaliller, Kepsut
 Kayacıklar, Kepsut
 Kayaeli, Kepsut
 Keçidere, Kepsut
 Kepekler, Kepsut
 Kızıloluk, Kepsut
 Küçükkatrancı, Kepsut
 Mahmudiye, Kepsut
 Mehmetler, Kepsut
 Mestanlar, Kepsut
 Mezitler, Kepsut
 Nusret, Kepsut
 Osmaniye, Kepsut
 Ovacık, Kepsut
 Örencik, Kepsut
 Örenharman, Kepsut
 Örenli, Kepsut
 Piyade, Kepsut
 Recep, Kepsut
 Saraç, Kepsut
 Sarıçayır, Kepsut
 Sarıfakılar, Kepsut
 Sayacık, Kepsut
 Seçdere, Kepsut
 Serçeören, Kepsut
 Servet, Kepsut
 Şeremetler, Kepsut
 Tekkeışıklar, Kepsut
 Tilkicik, Kepsut
 Tuzak, Kepsut
 Yaylabaşı, Kepsut
 Yeşildağ, Kepsut
 Yoğunoluk, Kepsut

Manyas
Manyas
 Akçaova, Manyas
 Boğazpınar, Manyas
 Bölceağaç, Manyas
 Cumhuriyet, Manyas
 Çakırca, Manyas
 Çal, Manyas
 Çamlı, Manyas
 Çataltepe, Manyas
 Çavuşköy, Manyas
 Darıca, Manyas
 Değirmenboğazı, Manyas
 Dereköy, Manyas
 Doğancı, Manyas
 Dura, Manyas
 Erecek, Manyas
 Eskiçatal, Manyas
 Eşen, Manyas
 Hacıibrahimpınarı, Manyas
 Hacıosman, Manyas
 Hacıyakup, Manyas
 Hamamlı, Manyas
 Haydar, Manyas
 Hekim, Manyas
 Işıklar, Manyas
 İrşadiye, Manyas
 Kalfa, Manyas
 Kapaklı, Manyas
 Karakabaağaç, Manyas
 Kayaca, Manyas
 Kızık, Manyas
 Kızıksa, Manyas
 Kocagöl, Manyas
 Koçoğlu, Manyas
 Kubaş, Manyas
 Kulak, Manyas
 Necip, Manyas
 Ören, Manyas
 Peynirkuyu, Manyas
 Salur, Manyas
 Soğuksu, Manyas
 Süleymanlı, Manyas
 Şevketiye, Manyas
 Tepecik, Manyas
 Yayla, Manyas
 Yeniköy, Manyas

Marmara
Marmara
 Asmalı, Marmara
 Avşa, Marmara
 Ekinlik, Marmara
 Gündoğdu, Marmara
 Saraylar, Marmara
 Topağaç, Marmara

Savaştepe
Savaştepe
 Akpınar, Savaştepe
 Ardıçlı, Savaştepe
 Aşağıdanişment, Savaştepe
 Beyköy, Savaştepe
 Bozalan, Savaştepe
 Çaltılı, Savaştepe
 Çamurlu, Savaştepe
 Çavlı, Savaştepe
 Çiftlikdere, Savaştepe
 Çukurçayır, Savaştepe
 Deveören, Savaştepe
 Dikmeler, Savaştepe
 Eğerci, Savaştepe
 Esenköy, Savaştepe
 Güvem, Savaştepe
 Güvemküçüktarla, Savaştepe
 Hıdırbalı, Savaştepe
 İsadere, Savaştepe
 Kalemköy, Savaştepe
 Karacalar, Savaştepe
 Karaçam, Savaştepe
 Karapınar, Savaştepe
 Kocabıyıklar, Savaştepe
 Kocaören, Savaştepe
 Koğukyurt, Savaştepe
 Kongurca, Savaştepe
 Kurudere, Savaştepe
 Madenmezarı, Savaştepe
 Mecidiye, Savaştepe
 Minnetler, Savaştepe
 Pelitcik, Savaştepe
 Sarıbeyler, Savaştepe
 Sarısüleymanlar, Savaştepe
 Sıtmapınar, Savaştepe
 Soğucak, Savaştepe
 Söğütçük, Savaştepe
 Söğütlügözle, Savaştepe
 Tavşancık, Savaştepe
 Türediler, Savaştepe
 Yazören, Savaştepe
 Yeşilhisar, Savaştepe
 Yolcupınarı, Savaştepe
 Yukarıdanişment, Savaştepe
 Yukarıkaraçam, Savaştepe
 Yunakdere, Savaştepe

Sındırgı
Sındırgı
 Akçakısrak, Sındırgı
 Aktaş, Sındırgı
 Alacaatlı, Sındırgı
 Alakır, Sındırgı
 Alayaka, Sındırgı
 Armutlu, Sındırgı
 Aslandede, Sındırgı
 Bayırlı, Sındırgı
 Bayraklı, Sındırgı
 Bulak, Sındırgı
 Bükrecik, Sındırgı
 Büyükdağdere, Sındırgı
 Çakıllı, Sındırgı
 Çaltılı, Sındırgı
 Çamalanı, Sındırgı
 Çaygören, Sındırgı
 Çayır, Sındırgı
 Çelebiler, Sındırgı
 Çıkrıkçı, Sındırgı
 Çılbırcı, Sındırgı
 Çoturtepe, Sındırgı
 Danaçayır, Sındırgı
 Dedeler, Sındırgı
 Derecikören, Sındırgı
 Devletlibaba, Sındırgı
 Düğüncüler, Sındırgı
 Düvertepe, Sındırgı
 Eğridere, Sındırgı
 Eşmedere, Sındırgı
 Gölcük, Sındırgı
 Gözören, Sındırgı
 Hisaralan, Sındırgı
 Ilıcalı, Sındırgı
 Işıklar, Sındırgı
 İbiller, Sındırgı
 İzzettin, Sındırgı
 Karaağaç, Sındırgı
 Karacalar, Sındırgı
 Karagür, Sındırgı
 Kepez, Sındırgı
 Kertil, Sındırgı
 Kınık, Sındırgı
 Kıranköy, Sındırgı
 Kızılgür, Sındırgı
 Kocabey, Sındırgı
 Kocakonak, Sındırgı
 Kocasinan, Sındırgı
 Kozlu, Sındırgı
 Küçükbükü, Sındırgı
 Küçükdağdere, Sındırgı
 Kürendere, Sındırgı
 Mandıra, Sındırgı
 Mumcuköy, Sındırgı
 Ormaniçi, Sındırgı
 Osmanlar, Sındırgı
 Pelitören, Sındırgı
 Pürsünler, Sındırgı
 Sinandede, Sındırgı
 Süller, Sındırgı
 Şahinkaya, Sındırgı
 Şapçı, Sındırgı
 Taşköy, Sındırgı
 Yaylabayır, Sındırgı
 Yaylacık, Sındırgı
 Yolcupınar, Sındırgı
 Yusufçamı, Sındırgı
 Yüreğil, Sındırgı

Susurluk
Susurluk
 Alibey, Susurluk
 Asmalıdere, Susurluk
 Aziziye, Susurluk
 Babaköy, Susurluk
 Balıklıdere, Susurluk
 Beyköy, Susurluk
 Bozen, Susurluk
 Buzağılık, Susurluk
 Danaveli, Susurluk
 Demirkapı, Susurluk
 Dereköy, Susurluk
 Duman, Susurluk
 Ekinlik, Susurluk
 Eminpınarı, Susurluk
 Göbel, Susurluk
 Gökçeağaç, Susurluk
 Gökçedere, Susurluk
 Günaydın, Susurluk
 Gürece, Susurluk
 Ilıcaboğazı, Susurluk
 İclaliye, Susurluk
 Kalfaköy, Susurluk
 Karaköy, Susurluk
 Karapürçek, Susurluk
 Kayalıdere, Susurluk
 Kayıkçı, Susurluk
 Kepekler, Susurluk
 Kiraz, Susurluk
 Kocapınar, Susurluk
 Kulat, Susurluk
 Kurucaoluk, Susurluk
 Muradiye, Susurluk
 Odalıdam, Susurluk
 Okçugöl, Susurluk
 Ömerköy, Susurluk
 Paşaköy, Susurluk
 Reşadiye, Susurluk
 Söğütçayır, Susurluk
 Söve, Susurluk
 Sultançayır, Susurluk
 Sülecek, Susurluk
 Ümiteli, Susurluk
 Yağcı, Susurluk
 Yahyaköy, Susurluk
 Yaylaçayır, Susurluk
 Yıldız, Susurluk

Recent development
According to Law act no 6360, all Turkish provinces with a population more than 750 000, were renamed as metropolitan municipality. All districts in those provinces became second level municipalities and all villages in those districts  were renamed as a neighborhoods . Thus the villages listed above are officially neighborhoods of Balıkesir.

References

List
Balikesir